Mike Vernal (born September 7, 1980) is a venture capitalist at Sequoia Capital in Silicon Valley. Prior to joining Sequoia Capital, he was Vice President of Search, Local, and Developer products at Facebook. 

Vernal joined Facebook in 2008. From 2009 to 2013, Vernal managed the Facebook Platform team and is credited with managing the Facebook Platform transition from desktop to mobile.   After transitioning to his role as a Vice President at Facebook, Vernal told Fast Company magazine: "We’re focused on making Facebook a place you go to answer questions, to make better decisions, and to get a better understanding of the real world around you. That’s really the five-year vision.” 

During his time at Facebook, he was considered among the “top executives” who ran the company.  

In 2016 after eight years at Facebook Vernal announced his plans to leave Facebook. In May 2016 he joined Sequoia Capital, a venture-capital specializing in technology startups. He is an investor in Rippling and Notion

References

Living people
Facebook employees
1980 births
Harvard University alumni
American venture capitalists